Pyaasa Sawan is a 1981 Hindi-language drama film, produced by Prasan Kapoor under the Tirupati Pictures Enterprises banner and directed by Dasari Narayana Rao. It stars Jeetendra, Reena Roy, Moushmi Chatterji  and music composed by Laxmikant Pyarelal, Lyrics by Santosh Anand. The film was " Super Hit " And the music also became popular. The film is a remake of Telugu movie Yedanthasthula Meda (1980).

Plot
Chandrakant, a young and energetic man, is in search of a job. Prabhudas, a millionaire, mistakes him as his wealthy friend's son, so, he offers him a job and also keeps him in his house under the intention to make his daughter Shanti's marriage with him. By the time, he learns the truth, Chandrakant and Shanti love each other and they marry against their elders' wish. After the marriage, the couple experiences much difficulty. Once Prabhudas insults Chandrakant and Shanti before everyone. Distressed, Chandrakant decides to take avenge by earning money, so, builds a huge empire by hard labour. But in that process, he neglects his wife Shanti and is unable to give much time to her.  Shanti becomes depressed, she gives birth to a baby boy Ravi. After some time, Chandrakant awakes and understands the virtue of the wife. But till then it is too late, he learns that Shanti is terminally ill and will soon die. Chandrakant tries in to save her utilizing his entire wealth but he couldn't and she dies. Years roll by, Chandrakant raises his son Ravi with indulge, he loves and marries Manorama. After the marriage, Chandrakant assigns the business responsibilities to Ravi and leaves for a tour. Here Ravi becomes busy, repeats the same story with Manorama which leads to disputes and quarrels between the couple. Manorama leaves the house and the matter goes up to divorce. At that moment, Chandrakant arrives, makes Ravi understand the greatness of the wife by revealing his past. Immediately he rushes for Manorama, she also moves by the guidance of her parents. Finally, the movie ends on a happy note with the reunion of the couple.

Cast
 Jeetendra as Chandrakant / Ravi (double role)
 Reena Roy as Manorama
 Moushumi Chatterji as Shanti
 Vinod Mehra as Jagannath (Manorama's father)
 Deven Verma as Sewakram 
 Madan Puri as Prabhudas
 Ashalata Wabgaonkar as Parvati

Soundtrack 
Music composed by Laxmikant–Pyarelal, Lyrics by Santosh Anand

References

External links 
 

1981 films
1980s Hindi-language films
Films directed by Dasari Narayana Rao
Films scored by Laxmikant–Pyarelal
Indian drama films
Hindi remakes of Telugu films
1981 drama films
Hindi-language drama films